Armaan Khan (born 4 April 1980) is a Pakistani former cricketer who played as a wicket-keeper and right-handed batter. She appeared in 12 One Day Internationals and five Twenty20 Internationals for Pakistan between 2005 and 2010. She played domestic cricket for Karachi, Balochistan, Sindh and Saif Sports Saga.

References

External links
 

1980 births
Living people
People from Chagai District
Pakistani women cricketers
Pakistan women One Day International cricketers
Pakistan women Twenty20 International cricketers
Karachi women cricketers
Baluchistan women cricketers
Sindh women cricketers
Saif Sports Saga women cricketers